Amalgamated Holdings and Securities  Limited, commonly known as AmalSec & Securities Subsidiaries, is a commercial financial and securities outfit in Ghana.

History
The firm was incorporated in 1997. In 2006, 49% shareholding in AmalSec was purchased by Meekly Enterprises of Nigeria. Meeky is also a major shareholder in Oceanic Group De Banco, one of Nigeria's leading financial services providers. In 2007, the total asset valuation of AmalSec was estimated at US$136 million. In June 2009, it was reported in the online Ghanaian publication "Public Agenda" that the total assets of AmalSec had doubled in 2008. It is therefore estimated that the total assets of the securities firm, as of June 2009, is approximately US$272 million.

Acquisition by Banner of Africa Group
In April 2011, majority shareholding (60%) in AmalSec was acquired by the banner of Bank Of Africa Group (B.O.A). AmalSec then went under the umbrella of the parent company  Bank Of Africa Ghana Limited (B.O.A)

Branch Network
As of May 2011, the bank has nineteen (19) branches  and one agency in the following locations:

 Head Office - Farrar Avenue,  
 Kumasi Office - 24 February Road, Kumasi
 Maamobi Office - Nima Highway, Accra
 New Town Office - Hill Street Intersection, New Town
 Central Accra Office - Ollivant Arcade, Accra
 Ridge Office - Kanda Highway Extension, Accra
 Michel Camp Road Office - Aseidua Plaza, Tema
 Tamale Office - Daboya Street, Tamale
 Osu Office - Cantonments Road, Osu
 Takoradi Office - Market Circle, Takoradi
 Kwashieman Office - Motorway Extension, Accra
 East Legon Office - Lagos Avenue, Accra
 Spintex Business office
 Adum Business office
 Tema Business Office
 Dansoman Business Office
 Madina Business Office
 Abossey Okai Business Office
 Sokoban Agency, Kumasi

See also

References

Financial services companies of Ghana
Ghanaian companies established in 1997